Dominic Thiem was the defending champion, but he chose not to defend his title this year.

Benoît Paire won the title, defeating Félix Auger-Aliassime in the final, 6–4, 6–3.

Seeds
The top four seeds receive a bye into the second round.

Draw

Finals

Top half

Bottom half

Qualifying

Seeds

Qualifiers

Lucky losers

Qualifying draw

First qualifier

Second qualifier

Third qualifier

Fourth qualifier

External links
 Main Draw
 Qualifying Draw

2019 ATP Tour
2019 Singles